NGC 7457 is an unbarred lenticular galaxy in the constellation Pegasus. NGC 7457 is its New General Catalogue designation. It was discovered by the astronomer William Herschel on 12 September 1784.

NGC 7457 is estimated to be about 43 million light-years (13.2 megaparsecs) away from the Sun. There are about 201 globular clusters in the galaxy. The core of NGC 7457 is surprisingly bright and compact, with many stars.

References

External links 
 

Pegasus (constellation)
7457
Unbarred lenticular galaxies